Bhatgaon is a town and a Nagar Panchayat in Raipur district in the state of Chhattisgarh, India.

Geography
It has an average elevation of 287 metres (941 feet).

Demographics
At the 2001 India census, Bhatgaon had a population of 8221. Males constituted 50% of the population and females 50%. Bhatgaon had an average literacy rate of 59%, lower than the national average of 59.5%; with male literacy of 73% and female literacy of 46%. 15% of the population was under 6 years of age.

References

Cities and towns in Raipur district

it:Bhatgaon
new:भातगावं